Tutgan (also Romanized as Tūtgān; also known as Tūtekān and Tūt Tagān) is a village in Olya Rural District, in the Central District of Ardestan County, Isfahan Province, Iran. At the 2006 census, its population was 108, in 49 families.

References 

Populated places in Ardestan County